Krzyszt of Czarniecki of the Łodzia coat of arms (b. ca. 1564, d. 1636) was a Polish nobleman and starosta of Żywiec.

He was son of Jan Czarniecki. Krzyszt had two brothers: Marcin and Olbracht. Krzysztof was born around 1564.

As a soldier he fought under Jan Zamoyski in the battle of Byczyna and in Livonia.
 
He was married twice: firstly to Krystyna Rzeszowska, and secondly to N. Brzostowska. From his first marriage, he had ten children: Piotr, Wojciech, Stanisław, Paweł, Tomasz, Stefan, Dobrogost, Franciszek, Marcin and Katarzyna.

Footnotes

Bibliography

1560s births
1636 deaths
Polish–Lithuanian Commonwealth people